Dalibor Volaš (born 27 February 1987) is a Slovenian footballer who plays as a forward for Sevegliano.

Club career
Volaš joined Eredivisie side Sparta Rotterdam in summer 2017.

Honours
Koper
Slovenian Cup: 2005–06

Maribor
Slovenian PrvaLiga: 2008–09, 2011–12, 2014–15
Slovenian Cup: 2011–12
Slovenian Supercup: 2009

Debrecen
Nemzeti Bajnokság I: 2013–14

References

External links

Player profile at NZS 

1987 births
Living people
Sportspeople from Koper
Slovenian footballers
Association football forwards
Slovenia youth international footballers
Slovenia under-21 international footballers
Slovenian expatriate footballers
FC Koper players
NK Maribor players
NK Nafta Lendava players
FC Sheriff Tiraspol players
FC Mordovia Saransk players
Debreceni VSC players
Sri Pahang FC players
FK Partizani Tirana players
NK Celje players
Sparta Rotterdam players
GKS Katowice players
NK Krško players
A.S.D. Cjarlins Muzane players
Slovenian PrvaLiga players
Slovenian Second League players
Moldovan Super Liga players
Russian Premier League players
Nemzeti Bajnokság I players
Malaysia Super League players
Eredivisie players
Tweede Divisie players
I liga players
Serie D players
Expatriate footballers in Moldova
Expatriate footballers in Russia
Expatriate footballers in Hungary
Expatriate footballers in Malaysia
Expatriate footballers in Albania
Expatriate footballers in the Netherlands
Expatriate footballers in Poland
Expatriate footballers in Italy
Slovenian expatriate sportspeople in Moldova
Slovenian expatriate sportspeople in Russia
Slovenian expatriate sportspeople in Hungary
Slovenian expatriate sportspeople in Malaysia
Slovenian expatriate sportspeople in Albania
Slovenian expatriate sportspeople in the Netherlands
Slovenian expatriate sportspeople in Poland
Slovenian expatriate sportspeople in Italy